Hassan al-Nouri (born September 2, 1960) is a Syrian politician who was a candidate for the Syrian presidential election in June 2014.

Life and career
Nouri was born in Damascus, and obtained a bachelor in Economics and Commerce from the Damascus University in 1982, as well as a PhD in General Management from John F. Kennedy University in 1989. He was the Secretary of the Damascus Chamber of Industry from 1997 to 2000. Nouri lost the 2014 election to Bashar Al Assad, with 4.3% or 500,279 votes, according to SANA (Syrian Arab News Agency).

References

1960 births
Living people
People from Damascus
20th-century Syrian politicians
21st-century Syrian politicians
Syrian ministers of administrative development
Damascus University alumni
John F. Kennedy University alumni
Members of the People's Assembly of Syria